Kokichi Shimoinaba (April 29, 1926 – February 17, 2014) was a Japanese politician and police chief. He served as Minister of Justice from 1997 to 1998.

Shimoinaba joined the former Home Ministry in 1947, just before the ministry was abolished. He then served as the Prefectural Police chief of Tokushima, Osaka and the Tokyo Metropolitan Police Department.

Shimoinaba was elected to the House of Councillors in 1986. Japanese Prime Minister Ryutaro Hashimoto appointed him as Minister of Justice in 1997.

Kokichi Shimoinaba died from sepsis on February 17, 2014, at the age of 87.

References 

Japanese police officers
20th-century Japanese politicians
Members of the House of Councillors (Japan)
Ministers of Justice of Japan
University of Tokyo alumni
Kagoshima University alumni
People from Kagoshima Prefecture
1926 births
2014 deaths
Deaths from sepsis
Infectious disease deaths in Japan